Philip Harold Hayes (born September 1, 1940) is an American politician and lawyer from Indiana. He is a former U.S. Representative, serving in Congress for one term from 1975 to 1977.

Biography 
Born in Battle Creek, Michigan, Hayes attended Rensselaer (Indiana) Elementary School.
He graduated from Rensselaer High School, 1958.
B.A., Indiana University, 1963.
J.D., Indiana University Law School, 1967.
He was admitted to the Indiana bar in 1967 and District of Columbia bar in 1977.
He was a lawyer in private practice.
Deputy prosecuting attorney, Vanderburgh County, Indiana from 1967 to 1968.
He served as member of the Indiana State senate from 1971 to 1974.

Congress
Hayes was elected as a Democrat to the Ninety-fourth Congress (January 3, 1975 – January 3, 1977). He introduced the National Climatic Program Act of 1975, a version of which eventually became law as the National Climate Program Act in 1978.
He was not a candidate for reelection in 1976, but was the unsuccessful primary election challenger to three-term incumbent Vance Hartke for nomination to the United States Senate.
County attorney, Vanderburgh County, Indiana from 2001 to 2002.

Later life
He is a resident of Evansville, Indiana.

References

External links

|-

|-

|-

Indiana University alumni
Democratic Party Indiana state senators
People from Battle Creek, Michigan
Politicians from Evansville, Indiana
1940 births
Living people
Democratic Party members of the United States House of Representatives from Indiana
Indiana lawyers